Blacklock's Reporter (founded October 2012) is an Ottawa-based Internet publication covering Canadian government administration. It publishes several articles each day, along with book reviews, poetry and guest commentaries.

Six reporters, including Tom Korski, banded together to launch the news site. Its name is derived from a Montreal Gazette war correspondent, Thomas Hyland Blacklock, (died 1934) who had been head of the Canadian Parliamentary Press Gallery.

In November, 2012, Blacklock's won a dispute with the Canadian Parliamentary Press Gallery to have its journalists accredited.

References

External links
 
 @mindingottawa Twitter account

Canadian news websites
2012 establishments in Ontario
Canadian political websites